Periclimenes aegylios is a species of shrimp found in the Adriatic Sea and the western Mediterranean Sea. It was first named by Grippa and d'Udekem d'Acoz in 1996.

References

Palaemonidae
Crustaceans of the Atlantic Ocean
Crustaceans described in 1996